Shane Bernagh Donnelly was an Irish rapparee who was active in the Cappagh and Altmore area of County Tyrone during the 17th century who would use the mountains as a vantage point to launch daring hold ups on carriages passing through the area on the main Dublin to Derry road nearby. Local legend has it that the highwayman assisted impoverished locals with his robberies, which primarily targeted members of the Protestant Ascendancy. A barracks was built in the Altmore area in an attempt to curb his activities but to little avail. Because of this Bernagh has over time become a local legend in the mould of Robin Hood who robbed from the rich and gave to the poor. 

He was eventually captured and executed by the Dublin Castle administration, and his body was cast into a lough at the summit of Slieve Beagh, which straddles the counties of Tyrone, Fermanagh and Monaghan. He was immortalised further by local scholar George Sigerson in his ballad The Mountains of Pomeroy and Irish poet John Montague in his poem A Lost Tradition. There is a small rocky area on the outskirts of Cappagh and Altmore called Shane Bernagh's Chair, called so as it is shaped like a chair. It received its fame from the highwayman, who used the rugged mountain area to hide out and launch his next attack on his unsuspecting victims. The nearby Bernish Glen is named after Donnelly as local oral legend notes that he once jumped across the glen on horse back as he sought to evade Crown forces pursuing him.

A verse from Montague's A Lost Tradition states that:

The heathery gap where the Rapparee, Shane Bernagh, saw his brother die. On a summer's day the dying sun stained its colours to crimson. So breaks the heart, Brish mó Cree.

Notes

External links
 Whisky in the Jar
 Some 130 lakes in Monaghan
 Galbally Pearse’s club
 Ulster guide

17th-century Irish people
Irish highwaymen
Irish outlaws
People from County Tyrone